The Walker River is a river in west-central Nevada in the United States, approximately  long. Fed principally by snowmelt from the Sierra Nevada of California, it drains an arid portion of the Great Basin southeast of Reno and flows into the endorheic basin of Walker Lake. The river is an important source of water for irrigation in its course through Nevada; water diversions have reduced its flow such that the level of Walker Lake has fallen  between 1882 and 2010. The river was named for explorer Joseph Reddeford Walker, a mountain man and experienced scout who is known for establishing a segment of the California Trail.

Course
It flows north through a rugged canyon which provides the route for U.S. Route 395. It then emerges into Antelope Valley, where some water is diverted to the Topaz Lake reservoir, enters Nevada in Douglas County, and turns northeast. It flows through Hoye Canyon into Lyon County, then across the Smith Valley, past Smith, and finally through Wilson Canyon into the Mason Valley, where it joins the East Walker.

The East Walker River also begins in Mono County, California, in the Bridgeport Valley, fed by several Sierra streams originating in the Hoover Wilderness, including Buckeye, Robinson, Green, and Virginia creeks. After forming the Bridgeport Reservoir at the town of Bridgeport, the East Walker flows northeast into Nevada in Lyon County, receives Rough Creek, and flows north along the eastern edge of the Toiyabe National Forest before its confluence with the West Walker.

Below the forks, the Walker River flows initially north through the Mason Valley, past Yerington, into central Lyon County. It turns sharply to the southeast around the north end of the Wassuk Range, flowing through the Walker River Indian Reservation where it is dammed to create Weber Reservoir. It flows past Schurz, where most of the remaining water is diverted for irrigation.

The lake has lost more than half its original surface area and 80 percent of its water volume.

Watershed
The U.S. Geological Survey divides the basin into 4 sub-basins:
West Walker of 
East Walker of 
Walker River of 
Walker Lake of 

The southern boundary of the Walker River drainage basin forms the northern border of Yosemite National Park. The Sweetwater Mountains lie between the West Walker and East Walker rivers, and the Pine Nut Mountains lie northwest of the West Walker. The lower Desert Mountains form the northern edge of the Walker River watershed. The Wassuk Range lies between the main Walker River watershed and Walker Lake in the east; the Walker River makes a long detour around the north end of the range in order to reach Walker Lake.

Of the irrigated areas, 23 percent are in the Bridgeport Valley (California), 15 percent are in the Antelope Valley (California), 15 percent in the Smith Valley (Nevada), 44 percent in the Mason Valley (Nevada), and 2 percent on the Walker River Indian Reservation.

Geology
Sedimentary evidence suggests that the Walker River has changed course in the past, flowing northwest through the Adrian Valley from a point near present-day Wabuska into the Carson River. There were some anecdotal observations of this phenomenon during the early 20th century. During these course changes, the Walker River ceased to flow into Walker Lake, causing it to dry up. Sediment deposits around Walker Lake have happened at least twice in the previous 13,000 years, although this may also have been due to severe drought.

History
The first humans to inhabit the Walker River basin may have arrived as early as 11,000 years ago. Prior to the arrival of Europeans, the Walker River was part of the territory of the Northern Paiute people.

The first European to see the Walker River was probably Hudson's Bay Company fur trapper Peter Skene Ogden, who had discovered the Humboldt River in 1828 and returned in 1829 to trap beaver south of the Humboldt Sink, although records are scant.

In 1833, Joseph R. Walker led a party sent by Captain Benjamin Bonneville to find a route from the Great Salt Lake to California via the Humboldt River, the Humboldt Sink, the Carson Sink, and then up into the Sierra Nevada by either the Carson River or the Walker River to near the headwaters of the Merced River and thence down to the San Joaquin River. John C. Frémont named Walker Lake after the trapper, and the United States Geographic Board named the river after Walker in its Fifth Report.

Due to a very heavy snowpack in the winter of 1996/1997 and a very warm spring, the West Fork of the Walker River flooded to unprecedented levels. Much of Highway 395 for the 30-mile span where it shares a canyon with the river was completely washed away.

Ecology
That North American beaver (Castor canadensis) were once native to the Walker River is evidenced by a 1906 article in the Nevada State Journal newspaper by newspaper mining writer Fitz-James MacCarthy (aka Fitz-Mac), who stated that the Mason's Valley of the Walker River in Yerington was well known to "the early trappers and fur hunters...Kit Carson knew it to the bone...The beavers of course were all trapped long ago, and you never see an elk nowadays..." Beaver have since re-colonized the Walker River watershed.

The Walker River and Walker Lake formerly supported Lahontan cutthroat trout (Oncorhynchus clarkii henshawi) or LCT; however, increases in salinity due to the declining water level have decimated the fishery. The last confirmed catch of LCT from Walker Lake was in 2009. A remnant population of LCT are still extant in By-Day Creek, a tributary of the East Walker River.

The riparian zone of the lower Walker River and its delta at Walker Lake provide important habitat for migratory birds.

In popular culture

In music 
The popular song Darcy Farrow, written in 1964, references the Walker River and geographic features from around the associated region in Nevada:

See also

List of Nevada rivers
List of rivers in the Great Basin

References

External links
Hydrology of the Walker River Basin

Rivers of Nevada
Rivers of the Great Basin
Rivers of Lyon County, Nevada
Rivers of Mineral County, Nevada